Dealer's Choice is a barbershop quartet that won the 1973 SPEBSQSA international competition.  They were the first group since 1952 to win the competition their first year entering.

References

External links
 AIC entry (archived)

Barbershop quartets
Barbershop Harmony Society